Josef "Bansi'" Quinteros (20 May  1976 – 19 June 2018) was a Spanish trance keyboardist.

Biography
Quinteros died on 19 June 2018 from a rare form of blood cancer known as multiple myeloma.

References

1976 births
2018 deaths
Spanish keyboardists
Spanish musicians
Musicians from Barcelona
Deaths from multiple myeloma